The Beaudesert railway line (also known as the Upper Logan railway line) is a disused branch railway in South East Queensland, Australia. The first section opened in 1885, the line was completed in 1888 and operated as a Queensland Government Railways (QGR) line until 1996 (Passenger service ceased in 1961). A heritage operation was undertaken for a short period in 2003. The Canungra railway line connected at Logan Village between 1915 and 1955, and the Beaudesert Shire Tramway connected with the terminal between 1903 and 1944. A study was undertaken in 2010 by the Queensland government concerning a potential Salisbury-to-Beaudesert rail corridor as a long-term potential proposal.

Route 
It branches off the Beenleigh Line at a triangular junction immediately south of Bethania station then progresses generally south-west to Jimboomba and then generally south to its terminus at Beaudesert, on the following route.

History
In 1877, a line was proposed from Wacol to Logan Village, Beaudesert and Tamrookum. A trial survey was taken around 1881 with the route commencing from Goodna. This line proposed 1-in-30 (~3.3%) grades, the steepest on the QGR system at the time, as well as requiring a bridge over the Logan River.

The line as built commenced at Bethania on the Beenleigh railway line, south of the Logan River and had the advantage of being a shorter distance of new construction. The section from Bethania to Logan Village was opened on 21 September 1885, with the Logan Village to Beaudesert section opened on 16 May 1888.

Initially trains were 'mixed' (i.e. consisting of both passenger carriages and goods wagons) until 1929, from when passenger services used rail motors.

Use of the passenger services declined with the increasing ownership of cars following World War II, leading to the termination of the passenger services in 1961. However the Beaudesert abattoir and the dairy farmers continued to use the freight services on the line until freight services terminated on 20 May 1996.

The line was unused until Beaudesert railway enthusiasts obtained an Australian Government grant to establish Beaudesert Rail to operate the line as a heritage tourism service.

Beaudesert Rail
In 2001, a grant provided by the federal government was given to a local group of Beaudesert people who traded as Beaudesert Rail (BR). The group set about acquiring rolling stock and locomotives. The line was upgraded to C17 use. When QGR services still operated on the Beaudesert Branch, only PB15's, B13's, B15's and 60t diesels were used. In order for Beaudesert Rail to commence steam services on the line, they needed to upgrade their track to carry the weight of their C17. The first Beaudesert rail service was held on 18 December 2002 with a run from Beaudesert to Logan Village and return. On 8 March 2003, Beaudesert Rail commenced steam-hauled services. Beaudesert Rail's steam locomotive was an ex-QR C17 #967. Built by Walkers Limited in Maryborough, 967 was in service for 19 years before being placed in a park at Caloundra. In 1985, the Ghan railway bought 967 as a gate train. In 2000, 967 was purchased and road-hauled to Beaudesert. Beaudesert rail then commenced services to Bethania on 4 April 2003. The last service to Bethania took place on 28 June 2003. Beaudesert rail experienced financial problems and the group disbanded in 2005. In 2006, the Zig Zag Railway acquired the former Beaudesert Rail carriages for use on their Blue Mountains system.

Remains
Whilst the track has not been substantially removed, many level crossings have been removed and paved over. The corridor is overgrown and many sections are utilised for livestock grazing. At Logan Village, only the platform remains and is covered with growth, the station area is rarely mown and fences have collapsed. At the Waterford - Tamborine road crossing the signals and signage have recently been removed after intersection upgrades. At Jimboomba, all that remains is the track. An attempt to remove the section of line here was made, but not completed. At Beaudesert the station building, water tower stand and the floor of the goods shed remains. Immediately south of the station building, the line has been covered with dirt and is now a car park. However, the station building has been repainted and a new station nameboard installed.

Proposed Salisbury - Beaudesert line
In 2010 a Queensland Government study proposed a new passenger rail line to Beaudesert utilising (and potentially duplicating and electrifying) the dual gauge line from Salisbury to Kagaru, then a new alignment to Veresdale, where the final ~9 km original alignment to Beaudesert would be utilised.

In November 2019 the Queensland Government and Australian Government agreed to fund a $10 million business case to investigate construction of two electrified narrow-gauge passenger tracks from Salisbury to Beaudesert and two dual-gauge freight tracks between Acacia Ridge and Kagaru, a corridor which is being proposed for the Inland Rail project.

See also

Rail transport in Queensland

References

External links

 

Railway lines opened in 1888
Closed railway lines in Queensland
Logan City
3 ft 6 in gauge railways in Australia
1888 establishments in Australia
Scenic Rim Region
1996 disestablishments in Australia
Railway lines closed in 1996
2003 establishments in Australia
2004 disestablishments in Australia